The 4th Royal Bavarian Division was a unit of the Royal Bavarian Army which served alongside the Prussian Army as part of the Imperial German Army. The division was formed on November 27, 1815, as an Infantry Division of the Würzburg General Command (Infanterie-Division des Generalkommandos Würzburg).  It was called the 4th Army Division between 1822 and 1848, again between 1851 and 1859, and again from 1869 to 1872.  It was called the 4th Infantry Division from 1848 to 1851 (as well as during wartime) and was named the Würzburg General Command from 1859 to 1869.  From April 1, 1872, until mobilization for World War I, it was the 4th Division.  In Bavarian sources, it was not generally referred to as a "Royal Bavarian" division, as this was considered self-evident, but outside Bavaria, this designation was used for it, and other Bavarian units, to distinguish them from similarly numbered Prussian units.  The division was headquartered in Würzburg.  The division was part of the II Royal Bavarian Army Corps.

Combat chronicle

The division fought against Prussia and its allies in the Austro-Prussian War of 1866, seeing action at Roßdorf and Roßbrunn.  In the Franco-Prussian War of 1870-71, the division fought alongside the Prussians. It saw action in battles of Weissenburg, Wörth and Sedan, and in the Siege of Paris.

During World War I, the division served on the Western Front. It fought in the Battle of the Frontiers against French forces in the early stages, and then participated in the Race to the Sea, fighting along the Somme and in Flanders, including the First Battle of Ypres.  It remained in the trenchlines in Flanders and the Artois, and fought in the Second Battle of Artois and the Battle of Loos in 1915.  In 1916, the division fought in the Battle of the Somme.  In 1917, the division fought in Flanders, including in the Battle of Messines and the Battle of Passchendaele.  For most of 1918, the division remained in Flanders, fighting at Armentières, Kemmel, Hébuterne, and Monchy-Bapaume.  Late in the year, the division went to the Champagne region, where it faced the Allied Meuse-Argonne Offensive.  After more fighting along the Aisne and the Aire, the division was withdrawn from the line, and spent the last week of the war on border defense in southern Bavaria and Tyrol.  Allied intelligence rated the division as first class and of the highest quality.

Order of battle in the Franco-Prussian War

The order of battle at the outset of the Franco-Prussian War was as follows:

7. bayerische Infanterie-Brigade
Kgl. Bayerisches 5. Infanterie-Regiment
Kgl. Bayerisches 9. Infanterie-Regiment
Kgl. Bayerisches 6. Jäger-Bataillon
Kgl. Bayerisches 10. Jäger-Bataillon
8. bayerische Infanterie-Brigade
Kgl. Bayerisches 4. Infanterie-Regiment
Kgl. Bayerisches 8. Infanterie-Regiment
Kgl. Bayerisches 5. Jäger-Bataillon
4. bayerische Kavallerie-Brigade
Kgl. Bayerisches 2. Chevaulegers-Regiment
Kgl. Bayerisches 5. Chevaulegers-Regiment

Pre-World War I peacetime organization

In 1914, the peacetime organization of the 4th Royal Bavarian Division was as follows:

7. bayerische Infanterie-Brigade
Kgl. Bayerisches 5. Infanterie-Regiment Großherzog Ernst Ludwig von Hessen
Kgl. Bayerisches 9. Infanterie-Regiment Wrede
8. bayerische Infanterie-Brigade
Kgl. Bayerisches 4. Infanterie-Regiment König Wilhelm von Württemberg
Kgl. Bayerisches 8. Infanterie-Regiment Großherzog Friedrich II. von Baden
4. bayerische Kavallerie-Brigade
Kgl. Bayerisches 1. Ulanen-Regiment Kaiser Wilhelm II., König von Preußen
Kgl. Bayerisches 2. Ulanen-Regiment König
4. bayerische Feldartillerie-Brigade
Kgl. Bayerisches 2. Feldartillerie-Regiment Horn
Kgl. Bayerisches 11. Feldartillerie-Regiment
Kgl. Bayerische 2. Train-Abteilung

Order of battle on mobilization

On mobilization in August 1914 at the beginning of World War I, most divisional cavalry, including brigade headquarters, was withdrawn to form cavalry divisions or split up among divisions as reconnaissance units.  Divisions received engineer companies and other support units from their higher headquarters. The 4th Bavarian Division, commanded by Lieutenant General Max Montgelas, was renamed the 4th Bavarian Infantry Division. Its regular 8th Bavarian Infantry Brigade was sent to the Main Reserve at Fortress Metz and replaced by a reserve formation, the 5th Bavarian Reserve Infantry Brigade with two reserve infantry regiments. The division's initial wartime organization (major units) was as follows:

7. bayerische Infanterie-Brigade
Kgl. Bayerisches 5. Infanterie-Regiment Großherzog Ernst Ludwig von Hessen
Kgl. Bayerisches 9. Infanterie-Regiment Wrede
Kgl. Bayerisches 2. Jäger-Bataillon
5. bayerische Reserve-Infanterie-Brigade
Kgl. Bayerisches Reserve-Infanterie-Regiment Nr. 5
Kgl. Bayerisches Reserve-Infanterie-Regiment Nr. 8
Kgl. Bayerisches 5. Chevaulegers-Regiment Erzherzog Friedrich von Österreich
4. bayerische Feldartillerie-Brigade
Kgl. Bayerisches 2. Feldartillerie-Regiment Horn
Kgl. Bayerisches 11. Feldartillerie-Regiment
2.Kompanie/Kgl. Bayerisches 2. Pionier-Bataillon

Late World War I organization

Divisions underwent many changes during the war, with regiments moving from division to division, and some being destroyed and rebuilt.  During the war, most divisions became triangular - one infantry brigade with three infantry regiments rather than two infantry brigades of two regiments (a "square division").  The 4th Bavarian Infantry Division was triangularized in March 1915, sending the 8th Bavarian Reserve Infantry Regiment to the newly formed 10th Bavarian Infantry Division.  An artillery commander replaced the artillery brigade headquarters, the cavalry was further reduced, and the engineer contingent was increased. Divisional signals commanders were established to better control communications, a major problem in coordinating infantry and artillery operations during World War I.  The division's order of battle on April 1, 1918, was as follows:

7. bayerische Infanterie-Brigade
Kgl. Bayerisches 5. Infanterie-Regiment Großherzog Ernst Ludwig von Hessen
Kgl. Bayerisches 9. Infanterie-Regiment Wrede
Kgl. Bayerisches Reserve-Infanterie-Regiment Nr. 5
5.Eskadron/Kgl. Bayerisches 3. Chevaulegers-Regiment Herzog Karl Theodor
Kgl. Bayerischer Artillerie-Kommandeur 4
II.Bataillon/Kgl. Bayerisches 4. Fußartillerie-Regiment
Kgl. **Kgl. Bayerische Minenwerfer-Kompanie Nr. 4
Kgl. Bayerischer Divisions-Nachrichten-Kommandeur 4

References
 4. Bayerische-Infanterie-Division (Chronik 1914/1918) at 1914-18.info
 Claus von Bredow, bearb., Historische Rang- und Stammliste des deutschen Heeres (1905)
 Hermann Cron et al., Ruhmeshalle unserer alten Armee (Berlin, 1935)
 Hermann Cron, Geschichte des deutschen Heeres im Weltkriege 1914-1918 (Berlin, 1937)
 Günter Wegner, Stellenbesetzung der deutschen Heere 1825-1939. (Biblio Verlag, Osnabrück, 1993)
 Histories of Two Hundred and Fifty-One Divisions of the German Army which Participated in the War (1914-1918), compiled from records of Intelligence section of the General Staff, American Expeditionary Forces, at General Headquarters, Chaumont, France 1919, (1920)

Notes

Infantry divisions of Germany in World War I
Military units and formations of Bavaria
Military units and formations established in 1815
1815 establishments in Bavaria
1919 disestablishments in Germany
Military units and formations disestablished in 1919